Gavan McCarthy (born 16 May 1945) is a former Australian rules footballer who played with North Melbourne in the Victorian Football League (VFL).

McCarthy, who was recruited from Yea, made two appearances for North Melbourne in the 1965 VFL season. His brother, Bernie McCarthy, was his teammate in the second of those matches, against Fitzroy at Brunswick Street Oval. He had another brother Shane McCarthy, who played for Geelong.

References

1945 births
Australian rules footballers from Victoria (Australia)
North Melbourne Football Club players
Living people